2C-T-4 (2,5-dimethoxy-4-isopropylthiophenethylamine) is a psychedelic phenethylamine of the 2C family.  It was first synthesized by Alexander Shulgin and is used as entheogenic recreational drug.

Chemistry

2C-T-4 is the 2-carbon homolog of aleph-4. The full chemical name is 2-[4-(isopropylthio)-2,5-dimethoxyphenyl]-ethanamine.  The drug has structural and pharmacodynamic properties similar to 2C-T-7 and 2C-T-19.

Effects
2C-T-4 produces psychedelic and entheogenic effects that develop slowly and can last 8–16 hours.  While users may experience virtually no effects for the first hour after ingestion, results vary drastically between individuals and range from hallucination and euphoria to intense sickness and anxiety.  Shulgin devoted a chapter in the first part of his book PiHKAL to this compound, describing an intense "plus-four" psychedelic experience mediated by a twelve milligram dose.

Pharmacology

The mechanism that produces 2C-T-4’s hallucinogenic and entheogenic effects has not been specifically established, however it is most likely to result from action as a 5-HT2A serotonin receptor agonist in the brain, a mechanism of action shared by all of the hallucinogenic tryptamines and phenethylamines for which the mechanism of action is known.

Popularity

2C-T-4 is relatively unknown on the black market, but has been sold to a limited extent on the research chemical market.

Drug prohibition laws

Canada
As of October 31, 2016, 2C-T-4 is a controlled substance (Schedule III) in Canada.

China
As of October 2015 2C-T-4 is a controlled substance in China.

Denmark
2C-T-4 is added to the list of Schedule B controlled substances.

Sweden
Sveriges riksdags health ministry Statens folkhälsoinstitut classified 2C-T-4 as "health hazard" under the act Lagen om förbud mot vissa hälsofarliga varor (translated Act on the Prohibition of Certain Goods Dangerous to Health) as of Jul 15, 2007,  in their regulation SFS 2007:600 listed as 2,5-dimetoxi-4-isopropyltiofenetylamin (2C-T-4), making it illegal to sell or possess.

United States
As of July 9, 2012, 2C-T-4 is a Schedule I substance in the United States, under the Synthetic Drug Abuse Prevention Act of 2012.

Homologue

2C-T-4 has one homologue, the structural isomer Ψ-2C-T-4 (2,6-dimethoxy-4-(i)-propylthiophenethylamine).  This compound was tested by Alexander Shulgin at a dose of 12 mg.

At this dosage its duration was very short and it produced few effects, however based on the research into the better characterized compound Ψ-DOM, the potency of Ψ-2C-T-4 is likely to be around 1/3 that of 2C-T-4 itself, so a more effective dosage of Ψ-2C-T-4 might be in the region of 20–60 mg; however high doses such as this might well be associated with toxic side effects, and so extreme caution would be advised.

References

External links
PiHKAL #41 2C-T-4
 2C-T-4 Entry in PiHKAL • info
 Ψ-2C-T-4 Entry in PiHKAL • info

2C (psychedelics)
Thioethers
Designer drugs
Isopropyl compounds